Pyrrhopyge is a Neotropical genus of firetips in the family Hesperiidae.

This genus comprises very numerous, partly extremely similar species which are difficult to separate and perhaps neither are separable as distinct species. Nearly all are large, strong animals with black body and wings, often with a bronze-green or deep blue lustre, often spotted red on the head and abdomen. On the broad, mostly pointed forewings the discoidal runs very obliquely, the upper median vein rising somewhat behind the middle of the cell. On the hindwing the lower radial and upper median vein rise unpetioled, the middle radial being absent. The hind tibiae are strongly haired outside. The Pyrrhopyge, according to statements by Adalbert Seitz, are conspicuous animals owing to their almost invariably one-coloured black colouring and the mostly glaring-red ends of their bodies. When they fly past swiftly, these red places are difficult to notice for the human eye, but the resting insect makes the impression as if its body were bleeding in front and behind. As the flight is impetuously swift, the animal escaping its enemies scarcely needs any protection, whereas on the topmost branches of bushes of 1 or 2 metres height, which are chosen by the males as their point of observation, one of the most dangerous enemies of the tropical butterflies is lying in ambush, the praying-cricket which even catches butterflies of the size of strong Papilio with a sure dart and is able to devour several large specimens a day. In the waiting attitude taken up by the Pyrrhopyge on the tip of the twig, the forewings are half erected, the hindwings somewhat more lowered; a position sometimes met with in European Adopaea or Pamphila, whereas other Pyrrhopyginae, such as the blue-striped Jemadia, the Mimoniades, Myscelus etc. keep their wings spread out when at rest, about like Thanaos tages. The larvae of Pyrrhopyge, as far as we know, are thinly haired on the body, shaggily on the head, brown or reddish with yellow, zebra-like stripes. They live on different trees, so on guava pear-trees (Psidium pyriferum and pomiferum), in leaf-cases. The pupae are haired, too. The imagines fly along the roads and skirts of woods in a raving, somewhat skipping flight and are fond of drinking from wet places on the roads. The Jemadia and Mimoniades love the umbels of blossoming bushes, where they are met with in the company of similarly coloured hesperids from other groups, such as Phocides and Pyrrhopygopsis.

Species
Pyrrhopyge zenodorus Godman & Salvin, 1893 – red-headed firetip – southeast Mexico to Costa Rica
Pyrrhopyge evansi E. Bell, 1947 – Evans' firetip – type locality Colombia
Pyrrhopyge evansi evansi E. Bell, 1947 Costa Rica, Panama, Colombia, Venezuela, French Guiana, Ecuador
Pyrrhopyge evansi borburata Orellana, [2010] Venezuela
Pyrrhopyge phidias (Linnaeus, 1758) – original firetip – type locality "Asia"
Pyrrhopyge phidias phidias (Linnaeus, 1758) Trinidad, Suriname, Guyana, Venezuela, Colombia, Peru, Bolivia, Paraguay, Brazil
Pyrrhopyge phidias hyperici Hübner, 1823 Brazil
Pyrrhopyge phidias latifasciata A. Butler, 1873 Colombia
Pyrrhopyge phidias bixae (Linnaeus, 1758) Suriname, French Guiana, north Brazil to Matto Grosso
Pyrrhopyge phidias rusca Evans, 1951 Ecuador, Peru, southwest Brazil
Pyrrhopyge phidias leucoloma Erschoff, 1875 Peru, Bolivia
Pyrrhopyge phidias garata Hewitson, 1866 Guyana, Suriname, [Venezuela?]
Pyrrhopyge phidias guianae E. Bell, 1932 Trinidad, Guyana, French Guiana
Pyrrhopyge aziza Hewitson, 1866 – aziza firetip – type locality Colombia
Pyrrhopyge aziza aziza Hewitson, 1866 Colombia
Pyrrhopyge aziza lexos Evans, 1951 Guyana, Colombia, Ecuador, Peru
Pyrrhopyge aziza araethyrea Hewitson, 1870 Ecuador
Pyrrhopyge aziza troja Evans, 1951 Peru, Bolivia
Pyrrhopyge aziza arbor Evans, 1951 Colombia, Venezuela
Pyrrhopyge aziza attis E. Bell, 1931 Bolivia
Pyrrhopyge aziza subnubilus Hayward, 1935 Argentina
Pyrrhopyge pusca Evans, 1951 – Pusca firetip – Peru, Bolivia
Pyrrhopyge proculus Hopffer, 1874 – Proculus firetip – type locality Guyana
Pyrrhopyge proculus proculus Hopffer, 1874 Trinidad, Guyana, Venezuela, Colombia, north Brazi*l
Pyrrhopyge proculus lina E. Bell, 1947 north Brazil
Pyrrhopyge proculus cardus Mabille, 1891 north Brazil
Pyrrhopyge proculus hyleus Mabille, 1891 north Brazil
Pyrrhopyge proculus cintra Evans, 1951 French Guiana, Suriname, Guyana, north Brazil, northeast Peru
Pyrrhopyge proculus draudti E. Bell, 1931 Venezuela, Colombia, Ecuador, Peru, Bolivia
Pyrrhopyge infantilis H. Druce, 1908 – infant firetip – type locality Peru
Pyrrhopyge infantilis infantilis H. Druce, 1908 Peru, Bolivia
Pyrrhopyge infantilis agala Evans, 1951 Bolivia
Pyrrhopyge thericles Mabille, 1891 – impostor firetip – type locality Brazil
Pyrrhopyge thericles thericles Mabille, 1891 northeast Brazil
Pyrrhopyge thericles orientis E. Bell, 1947 north Brazil
Pyrrhopyge thericles ponicia Evans, 1951 French Guiana, Suriname, north Brazil
Pyrrhopyge thericles pseudophidias E. Bell, 1931 Costa Rica, Panama, Venezuela, Colombia, Ecuador, Peru, north Brazil
Pyrrhopyge thericles raymondi Orellana, [2010] Venezuela
Pyrrhopyge thericles fola Evans, 1951 Colombia, southwest Venezuela
Pyrrhopyge thericles rileyi E. Bell, 1931 Ecuador, Bolivia
Pyrrhopyge thericles grinda Evans, 1953 Guyana
Pyrrhopyge thericles ronda Evans, 1953 Trinidad
Pyrrhopyge amythaon E. Bell, 1931 – Amythaon firetip – type locality Brazil
Pyrrhopyge amythaon amythaon E. Bell, 1931 Brazil
Pyrrhopyge amythaon gradens Evans, 1951 north Brazil
Pyrrhopyge amythaon peron E. Bell, 1947 Venezuela, Colombia, northeast Peru
Pyrrhopyge amythaon polka Evans, 1951 French Guiana
Pyrrhopyge amythaon perula Evans, 1951 Peru, Bolivia
Pyrrhopyge amythaon orino Evans, 1951 Colombia, Venezuela, Guyana
Pyrrhopyge amythaon pollio Evans, 1951 Peru
Pyrrhopyge amythaon podina Evans, 1951 Peru, Bolivia
Pyrrhopyge sergius Hopffer, 1874 – Sergius firetip – type locality Peru
Pyrrhopyge sergius sergius Hopffer, 1874 Peru
Pyrrhopyge sergius selina Evans, 1951 Brazil
Pyrrhopyge sergius andros Evans, 1951 Colombia, Venezuela (Amazonas)
Pyrrhopyge sergius andronicus E. Bell, 1931 Ecuador, Peru, Bolivia
Pyrrhopyge sergius semana Evans, 1951 Suriname, French Guiana
Pyrrhopyge sergius ganus E. Bell, 1947 Guyana, Venezuela, [Colombia, Ecuador, Peru, [Brazil?]
Pyrrhopyge sergius josephina Draudt, 1921 Peru, Bolivia
Pyrrhopyge caribe Orellana, [2010] – Caribbean firetip – type locality Venezuela
Pyrrhopyge caribe caribe Orellana, [2010] Venezuela
Pyrrhopyge caribe camachoi Orellana, [2010] Venezuela
Pyrrhopyge erazoae Orellana, [2010] – Erazo's firetip – Venezuela
Pyrrhopyge charybdis Westwood, 1852 – Charybdis firetip – type locality [Brazil]
Pyrrhopyge charybdis charybdis Westwood, 1852 south Brazil
Pyrrhopyge charybdis semita Evans, 1951 Bolivia, south Brazil
Pyrrhopyge cressoni E. Bell, 1932 – Cresson's firetip – Ecuador, Bolivia
Pyrrhopyge pelota Plötz, 1879 – pelota firetip – Bolivia, Paraguay, south Brazil
Pyrrhopyge amyclas (Cramer, 1779) – yellow-edged firetip – type locality Suriname
Pyrrhopyge amyclas amyclas (Cramer, 1779) Trinidad, Venezuela, Guyana, Suriname, French Guiana, Brazil
Pyrrhopyge phylleia Hewitson, 1874 – orange-edged firetip – type locality Bolivia
Pyrrhopyge phylleia phylleia Hewitson, 1874 south Peru, Bolivia
Pyrrhopyge phylleia delos Evans, 1951
Pyrrhopyge arax Evans, 1951 – Arax firetip – south east Peru, Bolivia
Pyrrhopyge haemon Godman & Salvin, 1893 – tawny-rimmed firetip – Costa Rica
Pyrrhopyge punctata Röber, 1925 – Songo firetip – Bolivia
Pyrrhopyge papius Hopffer, 1874 – papius firetip – type locality Colombia; Bolivia
Pyrrhopyge papius papius Hopffer, 1874 Venezuela, Colombia, Ecuador, Peru
Pyrrhopyge papius pasca Evans, 1951 Colombia
Pyrrhopyge frona Evans, 1951 – Inca firetip – Peru
Pyrrhopyge melanomerus Mabille & Boullet, 1908 – melanomerus firetip – type locality Bolivia
Pyrrhopyge melanomerus melanomerus Mabille & Boullet, 1908 Peru, Bolivia
Pyrrhopyge melanomerus patma Evans, 1951 south Ecuador, northeast Peru
Pyrrhopyge decipiens Mabille, 1903 – red-spotted firetip – [Ecuador?], Peru, Bolivia
Pyrrhopyge placeta Evans, 1951 – placeta firetip – Brazil
Pyrrhopyge hadassa Hewitson, 1866 – Hadassa firetip – type locality [Ecuador]
Pyrrhopyge hadassa hadassa Hewitson, 1866 Colombia, Ecuador, Peru
Pyrrhopyge hadassa henna Evans, 1951 Peru
Pyrrhopyge hadassa hanga Evans, 1951 Peru
Pyrrhopyge hadassa pseudohadassa Mabille & Boullet, 1908 Peru
Pyrrhopyge hadassa halma Evans, 1951 Peru, Bolivia
Pyrrhopyge terra Evans, 1951 – terra firetip – Bolivia
Pyrrhopyge telassina Staudinger, 1888 – telassina firetip – type locality Peru; Bolivia
Pyrrhopyge telassina telassina Staudinger, 1888 Peru
Pyrrhopyge telassina tagra Evans, 1951 Peru
Pyrrhopyge telassina shiva Evans, 1951 southeast Peru, Bolivia
Pyrrhopyge telassa Hewitson, 1866 – telassa firetip – type locality [Ecuador]
Pyrrhopyge telassa telassa Hewitson, 1866 Ecuador
Pyrrhopyge telassa phaeax Hopffer, 1874 Peru
Pyrrhopyge telassa silex Evans, 1951 Peru
Pyrrhopyge telassa croceimargo Mabille & Boullet, 1908 south Peru, Bolivia
Pyrrhopyge martena Hewitson, [1869] – Martena firetip – Ecuador
Pyrrhopyge schausi E. Bell, 1931 – Schaus' firetip – Colombia, Ecuador, north Peru
Pyrrhopyge sadia Evans, 1951 – Sadia firetip – Ecuador, Peru
Pyrrhopyge creona H. Druce, 1874 – creona firetip – Peru, Brazil (Amazonas)
Pyrrhopyge kelita Hewitson, [1869] – streaked firetip – southeast Peru, Bolivia
Pyrrhopyge crista Evans, 1951 – Crista firetip – Bolivia
Pyrrhopyge crida Hewitson, 1871 – white-banded firetip – south east Mexico to Colombia and Ecuador
Pyrrhopyge mopsus (E. Bell, 1931) – Mopsus firetip – Peru
Pyrrhopyge sarpedon (E. Bell, 1931) – Sarpedon firetip – Peru (Amazonas)
Pyrrhopyge arinas (Cramer, 1777) – Arinas firetip – type locality Suriname
Pyrrhopyge arinas arinas (Cramer, 1777) French Guiana, Suriname, north Brazil, northeast Peru
Pyrrhopyge arinas temenos (E. Bell, 1931) Peru
Pyrrhopyge creusae (E. Bell, 1931) – Creusae firetip – French Guiana
Pyrrhopyge tatei (E. Bell, 1932) – Tate's firetip – Venezuela
Pyrrhopyge boulleti Le Cerf, 1922 – Boullet's firetip – Colombia, Venezuela

References

Natural History Museum Lepidoptera genus database
Evans (1951) A Catalogue of the American Hesperiidae indicating the classification and nomenclature adopted in the British Museum (Natural History). Part 1: Introduction and Group A Pyrrhopyginae. Trustees of the British Museum. London. x+92 pp, 9 plates

External links
images representing Pyrrhopyge at Consortium for the Barcode of Life

 
Hesperiidae of South America
Butterflies of Central America
Lepidoptera of Brazil
Lepidoptera of Colombia
Lepidoptera of Ecuador
Lepidoptera of French Guiana
Lepidoptera of Venezuela
Fauna of the Amazon
Hesperiidae
Hesperiidae genera